Ballıca is a Turkic place name that may refer to:

 Ballıca, Elâzığ
 Ballıca, Düzce
 Ballıca, Tarsus, a village in the district of Tarsus, Mersin Province, Turkey
 Ballıca, Khojali, a village in Khojali Rayon, Azerbaijan
 Ballıca, Oltu
 Ballıca Cave, a cave in the district of Pazar, Tokat Province, Turkey